Thomas Moss is the name of:

Thomas Moss (jurist) (1836–1881), Canadian jurist and politician
Thomas Moss (minister) (1740–1808), English poet and cleric
Tom Moss (1928/29–2004), staffer to Strom Thurmond, second African-American Senate staffer
Tom Moss (politician) (1928–2015), American politician

See also
Moss (surname)